Sea View Farm is a township located in Saint George Parish on the island of Antigua, in Antigua and Barbuda.

Geography
It is located halfway between the capital city of St. John's and Potworks Dam, the island's largest reservoir.

The village school is Sea View Farm Primary.  

Sea View Farm is known for its pottery. Elvie's Pottery is the oldest pottery still in operation in Antigua today, where traditional handmade pottery can still be seen. The pottery was founded about 200 years ago. 

Notable buildings include the Good Shepherd Catholic Church and Kingdom Hall.

Demographics 
Sea View Farm has three enumeration districts.

 41100 SeaViewFarm-South 
 41200 SeaViewFarm-Zion 
 41300 SeaViewFarm-Central

Census Data

References

Populated places in Antigua and Barbuda
Saint George Parish, Antigua and Barbuda